Archbishop Mitty High School is a private, Roman Catholic high school located in San Jose, California, United States. The school is named for the late John Joseph Mitty, the fourth Archbishop of San Francisco. It is the first and only Diocesan Catholic high school in the Santa Clara Valley. Construction of the school began in 1963, and when completed, the campus occupied its present .  In 2020, Cal-Hi Sports named Archbishop Mitty the School of the Century.

History

Initially, brothers and priests of the Society of Mary (Marianists) were given responsibility to conduct the school. The school opened in the fall of 1964 with 189 male students, and the first classes of Archbishop Mitty were held on the grounds of the adjacent Queen of Apostles Elementary School. The newly completed high school buildings were occupied in April 1965. Archbishop Mitty High School expanded its student body in 1969 and began sharing classes with Mother Butler Memorial High School (on the site of the current Harker School upper school campus) and St. Lawrence Girls High School. Consolidation of the three schools was completed by the fall of 1972. With the creation of the Diocese of San Jose in 1981, Archbishop Mitty became the only high school owned and administrated by the Diocese.

In 1990, Bishop Pierre DuMaine appointed Mr. Tim Brosnan as the first lay principal to continue the fine tradition of Catholic secondary education at Archbishop Mitty. Under the new administration’s leadership, the school entered a period of tremendous academic and co-curricular growth.  Supporting this dramatic growth was a massive expansion of the campus facilities, allowing all aspects of the campus community – academic, spiritual, and co-curricular – to grow to their full potential. In 2018, Bishop Patrick McGrath and Superintendent of Schools Kathy Almazol approved the transition of Archbishop Mitty High School back to a president-principal administrative model, and appointed Mr. Timothy Brosnan as the first lay president of Archbishop Mitty High School. Following Tim Brosnan’s retirement in late 2020, after 30 years of service, Bishop Oscar Cantú appointed Mrs. Latanya (Johnson '92) Hilton the next president of Archbishop Mitty High School upon the recommendation of the Presidential Search Committee.

Academics
As a Catholic college preparatory school, Archbishop Mitty requires coursework in English, mathematics, social studies, science, modern language, fine arts, physical education, and religious studies. Archbishop Mitty also provides an honors and Advanced Placement program, offering students over 34 AP courses and honors courses.

A Leader in Classroom Technology
As of the 2012–2013 school year, Archbishop Mitty High School was one of the first in America to give Apple Inc. iPad tablet computers to all students and teachers. The 2010–2011 school year was a pilot year when a few select students were given iPads as a test. The iPads are equipped with electronic books and apps that the students are allowed to use. The iPads are closely monitored by the technology department so that their use remains strictly educational.

Athletics

The Archbishop Mitty Monarchs field 67 teams in 25 sports, most of them in the West Catholic Athletic League of the CIF Central Coast Section. Sports include football, badminton, basketball, baseball, cross country, field hockey, golf, soccer, softball, swimming, diving, tennis, track and field, volleyball, water polo, wrestling, and lacrosse. The Monarchs have a total of 10 national championships. In 2020, the school was named the Cal-Hi Sports School of the Century. In 2009, the school's girls athletic program was ranked first in the state and third in the nation by Sports Illustrated after Mitty won state championships in softball, women's volleyball, women's swimming, and women's tennis.

In 2019, the women’s basketball team – which included the 2019 Naismith National High School Player of the Year, Haley Jones – was named National Champions. Coach Sue Phillips ’86 has also been named the national coach of the year by Naismith and Gatorade. The Monarchs has been named national champions seven times since 2008. The program has also won the CIF State championship 14 times, including in 2001, 2003, 2004, 2008, 2009, 2012, 2013, 2014, 2015, 2016, and 2017. Notable alumni of the school include professional basketball players, baseball players, softball players, beach volleyball players, and Olympians.

Notable alumni

 Aaron Bates, professional baseball player and coach
 Kris Bubic, professional baseball player with the Kansas City Royals, 40th overall pick in the 2018 MLB draft
Angelo Caloiaro (born 1989), professional basketball player for Maccabi Tel Aviv of the Israeli Premier League and the EuroLeague
 Brandi Chastain, Olympic gold medalist and Women's World Cup champion soccer player
 Chris Codiroli, former MLB player
 Polina Edmunds, silver medalist at 2014 and 2016 U.S. Figure Skating Championships
 Aaron Gordon, NBA power forward for Denver Nuggets
 Drew Gordon, professional basketball player for BC Budivelnyk 
 Mitch Haniger, professional baseball player with the San Francisco Giants
 Myha'la Herrold, Broadway and tv show actress
 Trevor Hildenberger, professional baseball player formerly with the Minnesota Twins
 Haley Jones, basketball player
 Robert King, writer, producer, The Good Wife
 Danielle Robinson, WNBA point guard
 Raymond Townsend, former NBA player 
 Mike Vail, former MLB outfielder
 Steve Von Till, Neurosis guitarist
 Kerri Walsh-Jennings, winner of three consecutive Olympic beach volleyball gold medals
 Nick Yorke, baseball player, first-round pick in the 2020 MLB draft

Notes and references

External links
 Archbishop Mitty High School website

Educational institutions established in 1964
Roman Catholic Diocese of San Jose in California
Catholic secondary schools in California
High schools in San Jose, California
1964 establishments in California